Ieva Maļuka (born 9 April 2003) is a Latvian swimmer. She represented Latvia at the 2019 World Aquatics Championships held in Gwangju, South Korea. She competed in the women's 100 metre freestyle and women's 200 metre freestyle events. In both events she did not advance to compete in the semi-finals. She also competed in the 4 × 100 metre mixed freestyle relay event.

Her mother Jeļena Rubļevska is a former modern pentathlete who won a silver medal at the 2004 Summer Olympics.

References

External links
 

2003 births
Living people
Latvian female freestyle swimmers
Place of birth missing (living people)
Swimmers at the 2018 Summer Youth Olympics
Swimmers at the 2020 Summer Olympics
Olympic swimmers of Latvia
21st-century Latvian women